Kitur is a surname of Kenyan origin that may refer to:

Samson Kitur (1966—2003), Kenyan sprinter and Olympic and world medallist
David Kitur (born 1962), Kenyan sprinter and All-Africa Games medallist
Simon Kitur (born 1959), Kenyan 400 metres hurdler, brother of David and Samson
Joseph Kitur Kiplimo (born 1988), Kenyan long-distance track runner

See also
Keter (name)

Kenyan names